Antoine-François Botot, known as Dangeville (26 May 1681 – c.1737) was a French dancing master, dancer and ballet teacher.

He was born in Paris. His brother was the actor Charles Botot Dangeville. He made his début at the Académie royale de musique in 1701 and retired in 1748, although he remained a member of the Académie royale de danse until his death. Campardon lists Dangeville's roles

He married the actress Anne-Catherine Desmares in 1707, with whom he had two sons and a daughter, who all became actors – the most notable was the daughter Marie-Anne Botot Dangeville.

References

French male dancers
French ballet masters
Paris Opera Ballet dancers
Troupe of the Comédie-Française
1681 births
1737 deaths
18th-century French ballet dancers